"Foolish" is the third single from rapper Shawty Lo's debut album Units in the City. The song was officially released and added on iTunes on June 17, 2008.

Music video
The music video is first seen at the end of Shawty Lo's video for his previous single, "Dunn Dunn." The remix is the continuation for it. The MTV version of the remix video edits the part that says "cross your t's and dot your i's". This is actually a direct reference to fellow Atlanta rapper T.I., with whom Shawty Lo has a well-publicized amity.

Remix
The official remix features DJ Khaled, Birdman, Rick Ross and Jim Jones. Birdman uses the Auto-Tune effect on his verse in the remix. Rick Ross mentions his album Trilla going #1 and topping Snoop Dogg's Ego Trippin.  The remix has also been included as a Best Buy exclusive bonus track on DJ Khaled's album We Global. The music video for the remix is the continuation of the original that can be seen at the end of the "Dunn Dunn" video. Pitbull, Jadakiss, Lil Wayne, Ace Hood and Gunplay of Triple C's make cameo appearances in the video.

Freestyles
Chamillionaire has released two freestyles of this song on Mixtape Messiah 4. One was entitled "On the Grind Homie" and the other was called "Top Down, Money Up". An interesting fact is that the original freestyle (released on the Internet before the mixtape's release) had the chopped and screwed hook of "Top Down, Money Up" and the verse of "On the Grind Homie". For an unknown reason, another freestyle and hook were recorded, and "Top Down, Money Up" received the new verse, as opposed to "On the Grind Homie" getting the new hook.

Charts

Weekly charts

Year-end charts

References

2008 singles
Shawty Lo songs
Asylum Records singles
2008 songs